Bolu Museum is a museum in Bolu, Turkey. Bolu was a leading city of the Bithynia  kingdom of the antiquity.

Location
It is a two-storey building and a part of Culture complex of Bolu.

History
The museum was opened on 14 November 1981. It was damaged in 1999 Düzce earthquake. After a restoration period, it was reopened on 18 May 2006.

Exhibits
In the archaeology section which situated in the ground floor, the items from Neolithic, Bronze, Phyrgian, Urartu, Lydia, Hellenistic, Roman, Byzantine ages are exhibited. Some of these items are marble, glass, metallic and terra-cota articles. The sculptures of Asklepios, Hygeia, Telesphorus (from Seben Çeltikdere excavations) and Herakles (from Bolu), the bust of Hermes, stel of a gladiator are the most important items. There are 1678 items in the archaeology section

In the ethnography section which is situated in the upper floor, items from the Ottoman Empire age such as religious works, weapons, ornaments, clothes and metallic tools are exhibited.	Embroidery from Mudurnu region is also exhibited in this section. In a part of the ethnographic section a typical Bolu house life is portrayed The number of items in this section is 1680

There are also 15900 coins from Hellenistic, Roman, Byzantine, Seljukid, Ilkhanid and Ottoman ages.

In 2021, a painted female head statue which was discovered in 1970s, has been determined to be the head of Artemis.

References

Buildings and structures in Bolu Province
Archaeological museums in Turkey
Museums established in 1981
Ethnographic museums in Turkey
Tourist attractions in Bolu Province